Doravirine/lamivudine/tenofovir, sold under the brand name Delstrigo, is a fixed-dose combination antiretroviral medication for the treatment of HIV/AIDS.  It contains doravirine, lamivudine, and tenofovir disoproxil. It is taken by mouth.

In the United States, it was approved by the Food and Drug Administration (FDA) for the treatment of HIV-1 infection in August 2018.

References

External links
 
 
 
 
 

Fixed dose combination (antiretroviral)
Reverse transcriptase inhibitors
Merck & Co. brands